Mark Robert Kirton (born February 3, 1958) is a Canadian former professional ice hockey player who played 266 games in the National Hockey League.

Playing career
Born in Regina, Kirton grew up in the Toronto suburb of Scarborough, Ontario. He played minor hockey for the Wexford Warriors, then in the Ontario Major Junior Hockey League with coach Roger Neilson and the Peterborough Petes, from 1975-76 (with Neilson) to 1977-78 under Gary Green. During his final season, he along with other future NHLers including fellow Scarberian Bill Gardiner, Stouffville's Keith Acton, and goalie Ken Ellacott won the J. Ross Robertson Cup for the OMJHL title over the Hamilton Fincups. They lost in the 1978 Memorial Cup to Kirton's future NHL teammates John Ogrodnick (Detroit) and Stan Smyl (Vancouver) of the defending champion New Westminster Bruins, whom they defeated twice in the round-robin. Kirton was named the tournament's All-Star centre, and won the George Parsons Trophy for most sportsmanlike play.   

A month following the Memorial Cup loss, Kirton was drafted by the Toronto Maple Leafs as the 48th pick, in the third round of the 1978 NHL Amateur Draft, by the Toronto Maple Leafs. He played for the Maple Leafs, Detroit Red Wings, and Vancouver Canucks. He also spent several years in the American Hockey League playing for the minor league affiliates of his NHL teams.

Personal life
Kirton currently works as a realtor in Oakville, Ontario.

In 2018, Kirton was diagnosed with amyotrophic lateral sclerosis (ALS). After Kirton's former teammate and mentor Börje Salming was diagnosed with ALS in August 2022, Kirton provided support and guidance to Salming, after being reconnected through Darryl Sittler.

Career statistics

Regular season and playoffs

References

External links 

1958 births
Living people
Adirondack Red Wings players
Canadian ice hockey centres
Detroit Red Wings players
Fredericton Express players
Ice hockey people from Saskatchewan
New Brunswick Hawks players
Newmarket Saints players
People with motor neuron disease
Peterborough Petes (ice hockey) players
Sportspeople from Regina, Saskatchewan
Toronto Maple Leafs draft picks
Toronto Maple Leafs players
Vancouver Canucks players